The Tacoma Public Library system serves residents of Tacoma, Washington. It operates eight library branches, which include a central library in downtown Tacoma, two regional locations in north and south Tacoma, and five neighborhood branch locations. Tacoma Public Library has nearly 150,000 registered users, and over 2 million items in circulation. Tacoma Public Library serves a population of 198,100 people.

The Main, or central, library is one of 43 Carnegie libraries built in the state of Washington. Carnegie libraries are those built with money donated by philanthropist Andrew Carnegie. This particular library was built in 1903.  The Main library has been expanded since the original building was erected, and the Carnegie portion of the building now houses the Northwest Room and the Handforth Gallery. The Northwest Room holds a special collection of information on Tacoma and the Pacific Northwest. It includes photography, genealogy, rare books, and newspapers. The Handforth Gallery displays the work of local artists year round.

Tacoma Public Library offers the use of computers, databases, books, DVDs, music, ebooks, downloadable audio books, as well as programming for children, teens and adults. The library director is Kate Larsen

Branches
Downtown Tacoma (Main) Library
Fern Hill Branch Library
Dr. Martin Luther King, Jr. Library (closed due to budget cuts on January 29, 2011)
Kobetich Library
Moore Library
Mottet Library
South Tacoma Branch Library
Swan Creek Library & Literacy Center (closed due to budget cuts on January 29, 2011)
Swasey Branch Library
Anna Lemon Wheelock Library

References

http://www.waymarking.com/waymarks/WM1GNP
http://www.tacomapubliclibrary.org
http://nces.ed.gov/surveys/libraries/librarysearch/Library_detail.asp?Search=1&details=0&LibraryID=WA0068&ID=WA0068
http://www.nps.gov/nr/twhp/wwwlps/lessons/50carnegie/50facts5.htm

External links
Tacoma Public Library

Public libraries in Washington (state)
Education in Tacoma, Washington
Buildings and structures in Tacoma, Washington